The Department of Engineering  at Durham University is the department engaged in the teaching and research of engineering across a broad range of disciplines. It offers programmes in engineering and computer science.

The School offers four-year Master of Engineering programmes in both General Engineering and Computer Science. The School also offers three-year BSc in Computer Science and BEng in General Engineering.  In all these programmes, the first two years are common to all students with the opportunity given for specialisation in later years, into civil, mechanical, aeronautics, electronic, and electrical engineering.

Relevant undergraduate programmes are accredited by the Institution of Mechanical Engineers, the Institution of Engineering and Technology, and the Institution of Civil Engineers and the Institution of Structural Engineers. This means that the degrees offered by the School are recognised as meeting the academic requirements for progression to Chartered Engineer status. Computer Science BSc programmes are accredited by the British Computer Society.

In 2016, The Times Good University Guide ranked General Engineering 2/49 and ranked Computer Science 7/105.

Notable people
Sir Derman Christopherson
Sir Gordon Higginson
Michael Sterling

See also
Durham University Solar Car

References

External links
Department website

Department of Engineering
University departments in England
Engineering universities and colleges in the United Kingdom